The Red Line (Portuguese: Linha Vermelha) is an expressway in connecting São João de Meriti and Rio de Janeiro.

The first stage of the road was opened in 1978.

Junctions
{| class="plainrowheaders wikitable"
|-
!scope=col|Municipality
!scope=col|Neighbourhood
!scope=col|Destinations
!scope=col|Notes
|-
| Rio de Janeiro||Pavuna|| Rodovia Presidente Dutra - Baixada Fluminense, São Paulo||
|-
|rowspan="3"| Duque de Caxias||rowspan="3"|Duque de Caxias||Avenida Doutor Manoel Teles - Centro, Duque de Caxias ||
|-
| Avenida Presidente Kennedy - Centro, Duque de Caxias||
|-
| BR-040 - Magé, Petrópolis, Teresópolis, Juiz de Fora and Belo Horizonte||
|-
|rowspan="11"| Rio de Janeiro||Galeão||Estrada do Galeão - Rio de Janeiro–Galeão International Airport, Ilha do Governador||
|-
|Cidade Universitária||Ilha do Fundão||
|-
|rowspan="2"|Maré||Complexo da Maré||
|-
| Yellow Line - Méier, Jacarepaguá and Barra da Tijuca||
|-
|rowspan="4"|Caju|| Avenida Brasil||
|-
|Viaduto Professor Mário Henrique Simonsen||rowspan="3"|
|-
| Rio–Niterói Bridge - Niterói, Vitória
|-
|
|-
|rowspan="2"|São Cristóvão||Campo de São Cristóvão||
|-
|Rua Francisco Eugênio||
|-
|Rio Comprido||Túnel Rebouças - South Zone||
|-

References

Transport in Rio de Janeiro (city)